Upland hunting is an American term for a form of hunting in which the hunter pursues upland birds including quail, pheasant, grouse, woodcock, prairie chicken, chukar, grey partridge, and other landfowls.  Unlike aquatic birds (waterfowls and shorebirds), upland birds are terrestrial and tend to be found on the dry lands above the high mark of waterbodies, often hidden in heavy groundcover, so hunters generally employ the use of gun dogs to locate, expose and retrieve game.  The average group consists of 2-4 hunters with 1-2 dogs.  Normally, if there is one dog the owner usually handles the dog while the others focus on shooting.

Depending upon their method of work, some dogs (pointers and setters) are tasked to detect game, and some (spaniels) to purposefully startle ("flush") game.  When the birds are forced to flee out of concealment and into the open, either by the hunter or the dog, the hunter then attempts to shoot down the birds on the wing, also known as wingshooting.  Once downed, the game is usually either incapacitated or immobilized, and is then retrieved with a dog (retrievers) or by the hunter himself.

Equipment
Upland hunters use all types of shotguns from break-action single-shots to semi-automatics, calibered from .410 bore through to 12-gauge.  The quintessential shotgun for upland hunting is a double-barrel shotgun in a smaller gauge such as a 16-, 20- or 28-gauge, using small round pellets known as birdshots.  Upland guns can be extremely valuable luxury items, often commanding many thousands of dollars.

In North America some states such as Alabama and Arkansas require upland hunters to wear blaze orange clothing for safety.  They often wear vests to carry game, though there is a recent trend toward more functional technical daypacks specifically designed for the demands of more rigorous upland hunting in remote areas.

Dogs

Upland hunters work specially trained gun dogs to find game.  Spaniels and pointing breeds are used most often, though retrievers are worked with considerable success when hunting pheasant in many areas.

Upland hunters traditionally walk when finding game, though quail hunters in the southern states often employ buggies or vehicles due to the sparseness of game.  Because of the large area that must be covered in order to find bobwhite quail, many hunters employ specially designed hunting buggies to haul gears and kennels for fresh dogs.  On the other hand, chukar and grey partridge hunters of much of the western regions will hunt with one or two dogs on the ground for the duration of the hunt, hiking 8+ miles of steep mountainous terrain in a single hunt with well-conditioned dogs.

An important component of upland hunting for hunters is their partnership with their canine hunting companion.  The breed of dog chosen by a hunter should first and foremost fit the style of hunting of the hunter and then the primary type of game bird being hunted for the relationship to be successful.  A puppy's training may begin when the dog is around 4 months old.  Training often involves reinforcement of canine predator instinct, and some common training tools are: dog whistles, 6 & 20 ft choke leashes, and shock collars. A puppy can be brought into the field within a year, but dogs reach prime ability at closer to 3 or 4 years old.

Location
Pheasant hunting, the most popular form of upland hunting takes place primarily in open fields which provides cover for birds.  Upland birds can be hunted in a wide variety of habitats from deserts to high mountain elevations. This variety of locations is part of what makes upland hunting so popular. Some states such as South Dakota derive a significant portion of their revenue from upland hunters who travel into the state to take advantage of the ideal fauna.  Numerous pheasant hunting lodges are prevalent throughout South Dakota, most of them in the eastern half of the state.

Location is important when deciding the species of upland bird you want to hunt. Upland birds are found throughout the United States and much of the world, although it is most popular (by number of participants) in the United States.  There are two different ways that hunters can approach upland hunting, the more challenging way is hunting wild birds in less populated parts of the country especially the Midwest; the second way is hunting farmed birds.

Popular game birds by region in the United States:

Eastern/Northeast — forest grouse
South/Southeast — bobwhite quail
Midwest/Prairie — pheasants, prairie grouse
North Central Tier — forest grouse
Intermountain West — partridge, sage-grouse, prairie grouse
West — partridge, quail

See also
Upland game

References

Bird hunting
Hunting in the United States